"Contribution" is a song by British singer-songwriter Mica Paris featuring American rapper Rakim. it was released as the lead single from her second studio album Contribution in 1990.

Track listing

7" vinyl

12" vinyl

Charts

References

1991 singles
British hip hop songs
Island Records singles
Mica Paris songs